Quadratus is Latin for square. Quadratus was also a cognomen from the Roman Republic and Roman Empire. It may refer to:

People
 Lucius Ninnius Quadratus, a tribune of the plebs in 58 BC and a warm friend to Roman Senator Marcus Tullius Cicero
 Gaius Volusenus Quadratus, a military officer of the late Roman Republic in 40s BC
 Fannius Quadratus, a Roman poet and a contemporary of Horace
 Gaius Antius Aulus Julius Quadratus, an ordinary consul serving in 105
Quadratus of Athens, the Christian writer and saint 
Quadratus (martyr), the name of several saints and martyrs 
 Lucius Statius Quadratus, an ordinary consul serving in 142
Gaius Julius Quadratus Bassus, Legate at Judaea between 102 and 105, Consul of Rome in 105 and Proconsul of Asia in 105, grandfather of: 
Gaius Asinius Quadratus, the Roman historian, father of: 
Gaius Asinius Protimus Quadratus (died 235), Proconsul of Achaea in 220
 Any of various members of the Roman gens Ummidia

Anatomy
In anatomy, quadratus refers to a quadrilateral (square or rectangular) shape. Structures with quadratus in their name are:
Lobus quadratus, the quadrate lobe of liver
Pronator quadratus muscle, in the forearm
Quadratus femoris muscle, in the posterior hip
Quadratus lumborum muscle, in the back
Quadratus plantae muscle, in the foot

See also
Quadriceps
 The 2nd colossus from the video game Shadow of the Colossus
Araneus quadratus, a species of spider